Yoana Martínez Barbero (born 18 November 1980) is a Spanish badminton player. Martínez played at the 2001 World Badminton Championships where she was defeated by Nicole Grether in the first round. In 2004, she won her first senior national title in the women's singles and doubles event. In 2006, she qualified to compete at the World Championships, but was defeated by Xu Huaiwen of Germany in the second round. Martínez competed in badminton at the 2008 Summer Olympics in women's singles. She beat Erin Carroll in the first round and was defeated in the second round by Maria Kristin Yulianti.

Achievements

BWF International Challenge/Series 
Women's singles

Women's doubles

Mixed doubles

 BWF International Challenge tournament
 BWF International Series tournament
 BWF Future Series tournament

References

External links 
 
 
 

Living people
1980 births
Sportspeople from San Sebastián
Spanish female badminton players
Badminton players at the 2008 Summer Olympics
Olympic badminton players of Spain
21st-century Spanish women